Underground Development, Ltd. (formerly Z-Axis, Ltd.) was an American video game developer based in Foster City, California. The company was founded in 1994 by David Luntz and sold to Activision in May 2002. Following a rebranding to Underground Development in February 2008, the company was closed in February 2010.

History 
Z-Axis was founded by David Luntz in 1994, originally located in San Mateo, California. At the time, the studio was located in Hayward, California. In February 2008, Z-Axis was rebranded as Underground Development.

Activision reported in April 2008 that they were closing Underground Development, which had the time had under 45 employees in a Foster City, California office, at the end of the coming May. The studio was fully closed on February 12, 2010.

Games developed as Z-Axis

Games developed as Underground Development

References 

Defunct video game companies of the United States
Software companies based in the San Francisco Bay Area
Video game companies based in California
Video game development companies
Defunct Activision subsidiaries
Companies based in Foster City, California
Video game companies established in 1994
Video game companies disestablished in 2010
1994 establishments in California
2010 disestablishments in California
Defunct companies based in the San Francisco Bay Area